The 2009 season of the Esiliiga (the second league of the Estonian football system).

Overview

Standings

Promotion play-off

Relegation play-off

Results
Each team will play every opponent four times, twice at home and twice on the road, for a total of 36 games.

First half of season

Second half of season

Season statistics

Top goalscorers
Updated 11 November 2009.

Monthly awards
{| class="wikitable"
!width=75px|Month
!width=200px|Manager
!width=120px|Club
!width=200px|Player
!width=120px|Club
|- align=center
|03/09
|Zaur Tšilingarašvili
|Warrior
|Tõnis Starkopf
|Tamme Auto
|- align=center
|04/09
|Aleksey Zhukov
|Lootus
|Yaroslav Dmitriev
|Levadia II
|- align=center
|05/09
|Aleksandr Puštov
|Levadia II
|Sergei Popov
|Lootus
|- align=center
|06/09
|Aleksandr Puštov
|Levadia II
|Konstantin Karin
|Lootus
|- align=center
|07/09
|Andrei Borissov
|Lasnamäe Ajax
|Maksim Kisseljov
|TJK Legion
|- align=center
|08/09
|Aleksandr Puštov
|Levadia II
|Sergei Tasso
|Lasnamäe Ajax
|- align=center
|09/09
|Aleksey Zhukov
|Lootus
|Sander Rõivassepp
|Warrior

See also
 2009 Meistriliiga
 2008–09 Estonian Cup 2009–10

References

Esiliiga seasons
2
Estonia
Estonia